EuroMed Rights, formerly the Euro-Mediterranean Human Rights Network (EMHRN, French: Réseau euro-mediterranéen des droits de l'Homme) is a network of 80 human rights organisations, institutions and individuals based in 30 countries in Europe and the Mediterranean region. It was established in 1997 in response to the Barcelona Declaration, which led to the establishment of the Euro-Mediterranean Partnership.

The members of EuroMed Rights admit to universal human rights principles and are convinced of the value of cooperation and dialogue across and within borders. EuroMed Rights promotes networking, cooperation and development of partnerships between human rights NGOs, activists and a wider civil society.

Aims and achievements
EuroMed Rights was created in relation to the existence of the inter-governmental Euromediterranean Partnership (EMP), and in particular, the Barcelona Process proposed by the EMP. EuroMed Rights' role is primarily as an intermediary between governmental institutions and grassroots human rights organisations. It received most of its funding during its first years from governmental sources and is closely linked to the EuroMed Civil Forums that constitutes a relatively government-linked alternative to the grassroots Alternative Mediterranean Conference that was organised in 1995. As of 2008, EuroMed Rights had become well recognised both by European Union (EU) institutions and NGOs. Its activities range from communication among NGO members and activist campaigning through to lobbying of institutions.

EuroMed Rights describes itself as a regional forum for human rights NGOs and a pool of expertise on promotion, protection and strengthening of human rights. Its online library is an important collection of press releases, statements, open letters and reports about the Euro-Mediterranean region.

It states that it brings people together in inter-cultural settings to promote dialogue and understanding, with stress on the following subjects:
 lobbying human rights mechanisms within the European Union (EU) and the Euromediterranean Partnership, especially concerning the association agreements with the Mediterranean Partners and the European Neighbourhood Policy
 supporting reform processes in the Arab World by strengthening democratization processes originating from the civil society
 working towards transforming the non-European Mediterranean region into states of law, especially by backing movements for the enforcement of the freedoms of speech and assembly
 bringing human rights values and principles as well as women rights and the idea of public education to the public in order to achieve a broad popular participation in changing the living conditions where human rights are abused or denied
 sending of delegations and observers, and publishing urgent alerts in cases of deterioration of human rights and when members are in danger or imprisoned
 close and critical monitoring of the own efforts of the EU 
 information on human rights violations in North Africa and the Middle East by publishing reports, policy papers and newsletters
 research and training by means of training seminars and workshops

History

December 1997: The Euro-Mediterranean Human Rights Network was founded during a meeting at the Danish Centre for Human Rights (DHRC) in Copenhagen by a group of human rights activists from the North and the South of the Mediterranean. Founding people were then director of the DHRC, Morten Kjaerum, and Said Essoulami from Moroccan human rights organisation CMF-MENA. Further participants in the founding assembly (but no members of the EMHRN) were the Dutch Council for Refugees, the Egyptian Organisation for Human Rights, and the European Council on Refugees and Exiles.
1999: The network co-organised the EuroMed Civil Forum in Stuttgart.
2000: The EMHRN received a European Union funding contract. On its fourth General Assembly in Marseille, a new action plan was adopted, which saw the network multiplying its activities.  In the following years, an office in Brussels was opened and preparations for offices in Rabat and Amman were taken. More staff in addition to the Executive Director were hired.
2006: During the European Ministerial Conference in Istanbul a five-year plan for promotion of the role of the women in society was adopted, which included proposals carried out by the EMHRN.
2015: The Euro-Mediterranean Human Rights Network (EMHRN) becomes EuroMed Rights
2017: EuroMed Rights celebrated its twentieth anniversary
2018: The 11th General Assembly of EuroMed Rights elects Wadih Al-Asmar, President of the Lebanese Center for Human Rights, as its new president.

Structure
EuroMed Rights (formerly known as the Euro-Mediterranean Human Rights Network) has the following members:

See also
Euro-Mediterranean Human Rights Monitor

References

External links
 

Euromediterranean Partnership
International human rights organizations